Carnal Knowledge is  a short-lived British television game show relating to sex. It was shown very late at night, in accordance with its explicit subject matter. It was one of only a handful of shows to transfer from Channel 4 (where the pilot edition was shown as part of a sex-themed weekend) to ITV.

Gameplay
Each edition featured two different couples being asked personal questions by Maria McErlane about their sex lives. Graham Norton acted as the assistant.  One of his roles was keeping the scores.

References

External links
 
 

1993 British television series debuts
1996 British television series endings
1990s British game shows
Channel 4 game shows
ITV game shows
Erotic television series
Television series by ITV Studios
Television shows produced by Granada Television